Bobby Masai Southworth (born December 16, 1969) is a retired American mixed martial artist who fought in the Light Heavyweight division.

He has fought in PRIDE FC and appeared on Season 1 of The Ultimate Fighter. He was the first Strikeforce Light Heavyweight Champion.

Background
Southworth was born in Madison, Wisconsin and was adopted when he was six weeks old. Southworth has three sisters. He grew up in Santa Cruz, California playing football and basketball, surfing and doing track. After graduating from Soquel High School, Bobby continued to Cabrillo College and yet UC Davis, playing basketball in all of them.

His initial interest towards martial arts sparked after seeing Royce Gracie at UFC 1 and UFC 2. While Bobby was looking for a sport to stay fit, his friend invited him to a jiu-jitsu class in a nearby gym. Instantly hooked to the discipline, Bobby soon joined Cesar Gracie Jiu-Jitsu academy before moving on to Gracie Systems which was formed after Cesar's cousin Ralph Gracie moved stateside. Subsequently, Ralph opened his own academy in Mountain View, California where Bobby continued teaching and training jiu-jitsu. Bobby grew interested to take a no holds barred bout which was disapproved by Ralph, leading to Bobby's departure from the academy. Subsequently Bobby joined American Kickboxing Academy which at the time had no proper Brazilian jiu-jitsu program, so he took the responsibility of teaching the discipline.

Mixed martial arts career 
Southworth's first major exposure in the mixed martial arts world was when he faced Vitor Belfort on two-weeks short notice at PRIDE 13 on March 25, 2001. Southworth was overwhelmed by the Brazilian veteran and lost by rear naked choke in the first round.

In late 2003, Southworth had a falling out over money with Javier Mendez and briefly retired from the sport. Still having the spark to compete, Southworth mended fences with Mendez and rejoined the academy about a year later.

Return from retirement
Southworth then appeared on Season 1 of The Ultimate Fighter. He won his first preliminary fight against Lodune Sincaid, but lost the second versus Stephan Bonnar by split decision. Bobby returned to the house as a possible replacement for Forrest Griffin, should he not have been medically cleared to fight in the semifinals, but Forrest's cut healed safely and Southworth did not fight again until the undercard of the finale, where he fought a man he picked on in the house Sam Hoger and was defeated. It was a unanimous decision victory for Sam Hoger.

Strikeforce
Southworth next moved to Strikeforce, where his first fight was against James "The Sandman" Irvin. The bout was declared a No-Contest after a mere 17 seconds when in a freak accident, Southworth and Irvin's clinch pressed against the cage, pushing open the cage door and causing Irvin to fall out of the ring.

In his next fight, Southworth was given the opportunity to fight for Strikeforce's vacant light heavyweight championship against Vernon "Tiger" White. Southworth won a decision victory, taking White down repeatedly and controlling the pace of the match.

Southworth's next fight was a non-title bout against Anthony Ruiz, a fight that Ruiz won by way of TKO (cut) in round 2. A rematch was set up, but this time it would be for Southworth's championship. In a rather slow-paced fight, Southworth defeated Ruiz via 5-round Unanimous Decision on June 27, 2008 and thus became the only man to successfully defend the Strikeforce Light Heavyweight Championship.

In his next title defense, at Strikeforce: Destruction on November 21, 2008, Southworth lost the light heavyweight championship against former UFC Light Heavyweight fighter Renato Sobral "Babalu" by TKO (cut) of the 1st round at 5:00. Southworth was winning the round, having scored a takedown and controlling the clinch, until "Babalu" opened up a horrendous gash above Bobby's left eye with ten seconds to go. "Big" John McCarthy stopped the action to let doctors inspect, and Southworth finished the round by dropping "Babalu" with a punch just before the bell. However, when doctors got a better look at the wound between rounds, the fight was stopped due to the size and depth of the cut. Southworth announced he would like a rematch and Sobral verbally agreed, however a rematch was never organized and following Sobral's 2013 retirement it is unlikely a rematch would ever occur.

Post-Strikeforce career
Southworth also tried out for 11th season of The Ultimate Fighter. However, despite the fact that both the Middleweights and Light-Heavyweights were invited to try out, the UFC decided that the season would focus exclusively on Middleweights.

In the last bout of his career, Southworth faced Aaron Boyes at Xtreme MMA 2 on July 31, 2010. He won the fight via first-round knockout.

Personal life
Bobby has four children, 3 daughters and one son.

Bobby co-founded the American Kickboxing Academy Sunnyvale in 2008. In 2015, Southworth began coaching at UFC Gym Hollow Brook in San Antonio, Texas until it closed down due to the COVID-19 pandemic.

Championships and accomplishments
Strikeforce
Strikeforce Light Heavyweight Championship (One time, First)
One Successful Title Defense
The only fighter to have successfully defended the Light Heavyweight Championship

Mixed martial arts record

|Win
|align=center|10–6 (1)
| Aaron Boyes
|TKO (punches)
| Xtreme MMA 2
|
|align=center|1
|align=center|1:56
|Sydney, NSW, Australia
|
|-
|Loss
|align=center|9–6 (1)
| Renato Sobral
|TKO (cut)
|Strikeforce: Destruction
|
|align=center|1
|align=center|5:00
|San Jose, California, United States
|
|-
|Win
|align=center|9–5 (1)
| Anthony Ruiz
|Decision (unanimous)
|Strikeforce: Melendez vs. Thomson
|
|align=center|5
|align=center|5:00
|San Jose, California, United States
|
|-
|Loss
|align=center|8–5 (1)
| Anthony Ruiz
|TKO (cut)
|Strikeforce: Four Men Enter, One Man Survives
|
|align=center|2
|align=center|0:52
|San Jose, California, United States
|
|-
|Win
|align=center|8–4 (1)
| Bill Mahood
|TKO (rib injury)
|Strikeforce: Playboy Mansion
|
|align=center|1
|align=center|1:15
|Beverly Hills, California, United States
|
|-
|Win
|align=center|7–4 (1)
| Vernon White
|Decision (unanimous)
|Strikeforce: Triple Threat
|
|align=center|5
|align=center|5:00
|San Jose, California, United States
|
|-
| NC
|align=center|6–4 (1)
| James Irvin
|No Contest
|Strikeforce: Revenge
|
|align=center|1
|align=center|0:17
|San Jose, California, United States
|
|-
|Loss
|align=center|6–4
| Sam Hoger
|Decision (unanimous)
|The Ultimate Fighter 1 Finale
|
|align=center|3
|align=center|5:00
|Las Vegas, Nevada, United States
|
|-
|Win
|align=center|6–3
| Bryan Pardoe
|TKO
|X-1
|
|align=center|2
|align=center|0:14
|Yokohama, Japan
|
|-
|Win
|align=center|5–3
| Brian Vanderwalle
|Submission (armbar)
|IFC WC 18: Big Valley Brawl
|
|align=center|1
|align=center|4:28
|Lakeport, California, United States
|
|-
|Loss
|align=center|4–3
| David Pa'aluhi
|KO
|Warriors Quest 4: Genesis
|
|align=center|1
|align=center|0:16
|Honolulu, Hawaii, United States
|
|-
|Win
|align=center|4–2
| Floyd Sword
|TKO
|IFC WC 14: Warriors Challenge 14
|
|align=center|3
|align=center|5:00
|Friant, California, United States
|
|-
|Loss
|align=center|3–2
| Vitor Belfort
|Submission (rear-naked choke)
| PRIDE 13: Collision Course
|
|align=center|1
|align=center|4:09
|Saitama, Saitama, Japan
|
|-
|Win
|align=center|3–1
| Ivan Sequet
|TKO (submission to strikes)
|Bushido 1
|
|align=center|1
|
|Tempe, Arizona, United States
|
|-
|Win
|align=center|2–1
| Toby Oberdine
|Submission (choke)
|IFC WC 10: Warriors Challenge 10
|
|align=center|1
|align=center|2:30
|Friant, California, United States
|
|-
|Win
|align=center|1–1
| Bob Ostovich
|TKO (punches)
|SB 12: SuperBrawl 12
|
|align=center|1
|align=center|4:22
|Honolulu, Hawaii, United States
|
|-
|Loss
|align=center|0–1
| Jason Godsey
|Submission (choke)
|Neutral Grounds 12
|
|align=center|N/A
|
|United States
|
|-

References

External links
 
 
 American Kickboxing Academy (AKA) Sunnyvale

Living people
American male mixed martial artists
African-American mixed martial artists
Light heavyweight mixed martial artists
Mixed martial artists utilizing Brazilian jiu-jitsu
Strikeforce (mixed martial arts) champions
American practitioners of Brazilian jiu-jitsu
People awarded a black belt in Brazilian jiu-jitsu
1969 births
21st-century African-American people
20th-century African-American sportspeople